Puccinia hordei is a species of rust fungus. A plant pathogen, it can cause leaf rust of barley, also known as brown rust of barley.

At the time of Johnston et al., 2013's discovery of severe susceptibility in Golden Promise, this was considered to be the most susceptible variety in the world. Soon thereafter however, Yeo et al., 2014 found SusPtrit was slightly worse. These results alter the meaning of such a basic term as "fully susceptible" to brown rust.

See also
 List of Puccinia species

References

Fungal plant pathogens and diseases
Barley diseases
Leaf diseases
hordei
Fungi described in 1871